Rodney Michael Harvey (July 31, 1967 – April 11, 1998) was an American actor, model, and dancer.

Career
Born in Philadelphia, Pennsylvania, Harvey was discovered by director Paul Morrissey in 1984. Morrissey cast Harvey in two of his films Mixed Blood (1985) and Spike of Bensonhurst (1988). Harvey attended South Philadelphia High School through the 11th grade, but dropped out to pursue a movie career. After signing with an agent, Harvey moved to Los Angeles where he continued acting and also began modeling. He appeared in a layout for Life magazine featuring Madonna photographed by Bruce Weber and worked for Calvin Klein.

In 1990, he landed the role of Sodapop Curtis in the Fox series The Outsiders. After the series ended after one season, Harvey guest starred on Twin Peaks, followed by a role in the Gus Van Sant film My Own Private Idaho. Harvey also appeared in the 1988 film Salsa alongside Draco Rosa. He made his last onscreen appearance in 1996 with a role in the drama God's Lonely Man.

Death
During the making of My Own Private Idaho, Harvey began using heroin.  After several stints in jail and attempts to get clean, he died of a heroin and cocaine overdose on April 11, 1998 at the Hotel Barbizon in Los Angeles.

After his death, photos of him in the depths of heroin addiction appeared in an Office of Drug Control Policy (Partnership for a Drug-Free America) public service announcement.

Filmography

References

External links
 
 

1967 births
1998 deaths
20th-century American male actors
American male film actors
Male models from Philadelphia
American male television actors
Burials in Pennsylvania
Cocaine-related deaths in California
Deaths by heroin overdose in California
Drug-related deaths in California
Male actors from Philadelphia
South Philadelphia High School alumni